The 2021–22 Second League was the 67th season of the Second League, the second tier of the Bulgarian football league system, and the 6th season under this name and current league structure.

For this season, the league was expanded from 17 to 20 teams, with four teams promoted from the Third League, as well as two reserve teams being added to the league. This makes this season the largest in terms of number of teams competing since the 2011–12 season, when 20 teams competed in two separate divisions.

Due to the COVID-19 pandemic, stadiums were initially limited to 50% capacity, with the spectators also being subject to compliance with social distancing and the wearing of face masks. Since 7 September 2021, only 30% of the stadium could be occupied. In mid September 2021, the Football Union postponed the next three Levski Lom matches (two for the league and one for the Cup) after 12 of the team's players tested positive for the coronavirus. From 14 October 2021, no fans were allowed at the stadiums of the teams based in Sofia Province and Sofia City Province. From 21 October, a prerequisite to fan attendance was the possession of a green certificate, entailing proof of vaccination, recovery from an infection or a negative COVID-19 test. From 24 February 2022, the green pass was no longer required for spectators, though it remained in place for the staff and event organizers. From 21 March 2022, the vaccine pass was abolished for all public activities, including football matches.

On 4 November 2021 the professional football license of Neftochimic was revoked by the Licensing commission of the Bulgarian Football Union as a result of the club not following financial fair play rules and outstanding payments towards personnel and state institutions. In the following days the team was to be removed from the group and its matches annulled. On 19 November the BFU confirmed its decision and removed Neftochimic from the group, annulling all their fixtures played until that point. 

On 16 March 2022 Levski Lom decided to discontinue its participation in the league, citing the club's position in the league standings and financial issues. On March 17, as a result of the team`s withdrawal, the sports-technical commission of BFU removed Levski Lom from the group. Team`s results up to that date still count toward the league standings with opponents awarded 3:0 wins for the remainder of the season.

Teams
The following teams have changed division since the 2020–21 season.

To Second League 
Introduced reserve team
 Botev Plovdiv II
 CSKA 1948 II
Promoted from Third League
 Spartak Varna
 Levski Lom
 Marek Dupnitsa
 Maritsa Plovdiv

Relegated from First League
 Etar
 Montana

From Second League 
Relegated to Third League
 Lokomotiv Gorna Oryahovitsa
 Kariana
 Vitosha Bistritsa

Promoted to First League
 Pirin
 Lokomotiv Sofia

Stadia and locations

Personnel and sponsorship
Note: Flags indicate national team as has been defined under FIFA eligibility rules. Players and managers may hold more than one non-FIFA nationality.

Note: Individual clubs may wear jerseys with advertising. However, only one sponsorship is permitted per jersey for official tournaments organised by UEFA in addition to that of the kit manufacturer (exceptions are made for non-profit organisations).
Clubs in the domestic league can have more than one sponsorship per jersey which can feature on the front of the shirt, incorporated with the main sponsor or in place of it; or on the back, either below the squad number or on the collar area. Shorts also have space available for advertisement.

Managerial changes

League table

Results

References 

2021-22
2
Bul